Bristow is a surname, derived from the earlier name of the city of Bristol. Notable people with the surname include:

Abraham Bristow (c. 1771 – 1846), British mariner
Alan Bristow (1923-2009), British helicopter entrepreneur, founder of Bristow Helicopters
Allan Bristow (born 1951), American basketball coach
Benjamin Bristow (1832–1896), American lawyer and politician
Chris Bristow (1937–1960), British racing driver
Edmund Bristow (1787–1876), English artist
Emma Bristow (born 1990), British motorcycle racer
Eric Bristow (1957–2018), English darts player
George Bristow (disambiguation), any of several people by that name
Grant Bristow (born 1958), Canadian security agent
Guy Bristow (born 1955), English footballer
Gwen Bristow (1903–1980), American author and journalist
Henry William Bristow (1817–1889), English geologist
John Bristow (1701–1768), English merchant and politician
Joseph Bristow (professor), British academic
Joseph L. Bristow (1861–1944), American politician
Laurie Bristow (born 1963), British diplomat
Mark Bristow (born 1962), English paralympic cyclist
Mark Bristow (businessman) (born 1959), South African businessman
Naomi Bristow (born 1997), Canadian country music artist 
Patrick Bristow (born 1962), American actor
Paul Bristow, British politician
Richard Bristow (1538–1581), English Catholic writer
 Robert Bristow (1662–1706), MP for Winchelsea 1698–1701
 Robert Bristow (1687–1737), MP for Winchelsea 1708–37
 Robert Bristow (1712–1776), MP for Winchelsea  1738–41, New Shoreham 1747–61
 Robert Bristow (engineer) (1880–1966), British harbour engineer best known for development of the port of Kochi in India

Fictional characters
Jack Bristow, on the television series Alias
Irina Derevko, a character on the television series Alias also known as "Laura Bristow"
Sydney Bristow, on the television series Alias

See also 
Ethel Bristowe
Richard Bristowe (disambiguation)
W.S. Bristowe (1901–1979), English naturalist

English-language surnames
Surnames of English origin